Remziye is a Turkish feminine given name. Notable people with the name include:

Remziye Bakır (born 1997), Turkish footballer
Remziye Hisar (1902–1992), Turkish academic and chemist
Remziye Sıvacı (born 1965), Turkish politician
Remziye Tarsinova, Soviet and Ukrainian dancer

Turkish feminine given names